Ash Creek is a stream northern Washington County, Utah. It is a tributary of the Virgin River. Ash Creek was named after the ash timber near its course.

See also
 List of rivers of Utah
 List of tributaries of the Colorado River

References

External links

Rivers of Washington County, Utah
Rivers of Utah